Roger Clark Miller (born February 24, 1952) is an American singer, songwriter and multi-instrumentalist best known for co-founding Mission of Burma and performing in Alloy Orchestra/The Anvil Orchestra.

His main instruments are guitar and piano. Guitar Player magazine describes Miller's guitar playing as balancing rock energy with cerebral experimentation. He also plays cornet, bass guitar and percussion.

Biography

Early life
Miller was born in Ann Arbor, Michigan, on February 24, 1952. His father was a professor of ichthyology, which prompted frequent travel to the Western United States during summers—in search of fish in isolated springs in the desert for comparison with the fossil record—in which he brought his son along. These expeditions informed his later artistic outlook, which incorporate themes of nature, harsh environments, the passage of time and self-reliance.

Miller began piano lessons at the age of 6. In middle school, he studied the french horn in band class, and at age 13, he picked up the guitar.

Sproton Layer (1960s)
Inspired by Jimi Hendrix and Detroit-area bands like the Stooges, the SRC, and the MC5, Miller formed several garage bands in his teens, starting with the Sky High Purple Band in 1967. With brothers Benjamin (Ben) Miller and Laurence B. (Larry) Miller, he formed Sproton Layer in fall 1969; Miller played bass guitar and was the primary singer and songwriter. They recorded a demo for an album in 1970; these recordings were collected and released in 1992 and again in 2011 as With Magnetic Fields Disrupted. The Miller brothers have an occasional ongoing collaboration called M3.

Attending CalArts in 1976, majoring in composition, Miller also studied piano and French Horn, and studied music by 20th century experimental composers like John Cage and Karlheinz Stockhausen. He dropped out of college in favor of punk rock.

First Mission of Burma line-up and break-up (1979–1983)
Relocating to Boston, Massachusetts, Miller was a member of the short-lived Moving Parts before co-founding Mission of Burma in 1979.

Mission of Burma disbanded in 1983 due in large part to Miller's worsening tinnitus, attributed in large part to their notoriously loud live performances. In subsequent years, Mission of Burma's small body of recordings grew to be regarded as important and influential.

During the Burma years, Miller worked as a freelance piano tuner.

Other bands (1983–present)

After Burma broke up, Miller turned his attention to playing piano with the more experimental, instrumental group Birdsongs of the Mesozoic, which he left in 1987. Miller's current rock trio, Trinary System, released a 5-song EP in 2016 and an LP in 2019.

Afterward, Miller had several collaborations, solo efforts, and film scores; many of these post-Burma albums were released by SST Records:
Alloy Orchestra, a trio with Miller on keyboards that composes new scores for silent films. The group's name refers to the many metal objects (hubcaps, springs and pots) used by percussionists Ken Winokur and Terry Donahue. This group morphed into The Anvil Orchestra in remains active.
Solo Electric Guitar Ensemble, a multiple-guitar/live loops ensemble. Performances began fall 2020 (virtual at first).
M2, an ongoing musical collaboration with Benjamin Miller with Miller on prepared piano.
Exquisite Corpse, an instrumental group with Miller on guitar, piano, and sampler; violinist; percussionist; and a shawm/sackbutt player.
Binary System, an instrumental, piano/drums duo with percussionist Larry Dersch.
Hooker/Miller/Ranaldo, a free improvisation group composed of William Hooker (percussion), Lee Ranaldo (guitar), and Miller (bass).
M3, a musical collaboration with Benjamin Miller and Laurence Miller.
Maximum Electric Piano (solo prepared piano with loops).
No Man (rock-oriented project with Russell Smith on bass and Ken Winokur or Malcolm Travis on drums).
Elemental Guitar (solo prepared guitar with loops).
Trinary System (rock trio more psychedelic and less punk than Mission of Burma).

Reformation of Mission of Burma (2002–2020)
Mission of Burma reunited in 2002, with Bob Weston replacing Swope. On stage, Miller had his Marshall amplifier at the edge of the stage on his right, with the speakers facing away from him (as seen in the reunion footage in the M0B documentary Not a Photograph).  The band released four albums since reforming; the latest is Unsound, July 2012, on Fire Records.

Many bands have cited Burma as an inspiration, including Nirvana, Pearl Jam, Foo Fighters, Superchunk, Jawbox, The Grifters, R.E.M., Miracle Legion (the last two have even covered "Academy Fight Song": the former on their Green tour and the latter on their debut), Sonic Youth, Drive Like Jehu, Throwing Muses, Yo La Tengo, Fugazi, Pixies, Sugar, Guided by Voices, Shellac, Catherine Wheel, Graham Coxon, Pegboy, Moby and Down by Law - the last five of which have covered Conley's "That's When I Reach for My Revolver". In 2009 the city of Boston declared October 4 to be "Mission of Burma Day" in honor of the band's work in a ceremony held at the MIT East Campus Courtyard.

Soundtrack work
Miller has created soundtrack scores for animation, documentary (Big Ideas for a Small Planet, 2007), and commercials. Four of the films he has scored have premiered at the Sundance Film Festival, which has included 500 Years (2016) and Granito: How to Nail a Dictator (2011).

Non-musical activities
Miller has blogged for Slate and HuffPost, and written a review about Mike Goldsmith's book Discord for The Wall Street Journal.  His short story "Insect Futures" was published in Penny Ante III. His drawings have appeared in numerous shows since 2003.

Miller also has conducted "A Night of Surrealist Games" at Arts at the Armory (Somerville, MA), Mass MoCA (North Adams, MA), the Institute of Contemporary Art (Boston, MA), Real Art Ways (Hartford, CT.), 3S Artspace (Portsmouth, N.H.), Portsmouth Book & Bar (Portsmouth, N.H), Brattleboro Museum and Art Center (Brattleboro, VT), and 118 Elliot Gallery (Brattleboro, VT). He has shown his Surrealist drawings in solo and group exhibitions.

Discography

Solo albums
 Eight Dream Interpretations for Solo Electric Guitar Ensemble (Cuneiform, 2022)
 No Man Is Hurting Me (Ace of Hearts, 1986)
 Groping Hands EP (Ace of Hearts, 1986)
 The Big Industry (Ace of Hearts, 1987)
 Win Instantly (Ace of Hearts, 1988)
 Oh (Forced Exposure, 1988)
 XYLYL and A Woman in Half (New Alliance, 1991)
 Elemental Guitar (SST, 1995)
 The Benevolent Disruptive Ray (SST, 1996)

Mission of Burma

The Fourth World Quartet
 1975 (Cuneiform, 2021)

Anvil Orchestra
 The History of the Civil War (CD, Cosmic Cowboy, 2022)

Alloy Orchestra
 L'inhumaine Blu-ray
 Phantom of the Opera Blu-ray and DVD
 Man with the Movie Camera DVD and Blu-ray (Image)
 STRIKE! DVD (Image)
 Fatty Arbuckle Vol. I and II DVD (KINO)
 The General/Steamboat Bill, Jr. DVD (Image)
 Slapstick Masters DVD (Image)
 The Lost World DVD (Image)
 Phantom of the Opera Blu-ray (Image)
 Dragonflies the Baby Cries DVD
 Manslaughter DVD (KINO)
 Wild and Weird DVD
 Masters Of Slapstick CD (Accurate, 2001)
 Lonesome CD (Accurate, 1996)
 Silents CD (Accurate, 1998)
 Metropolis CD (Alloy Orchestra)
 Underworld CD (Alloy Orchestra)

Binary System
With Roger Miller and Larry Dersch:
 Live at the Idea Room (SST, 1997)
 Boston Underbelly V/A Compilation "Impov. #4 October 5, 1996" (Sublingual, 1998)
 from the Epicenter (Atavistic, 1999)
 Invention Box (Atavistic, 2001)

Birdsongs of the Mesozoic
 A Wicked Good Time V/A Compilation "Pulse Piece" (Modern Method, 1981)
 Birdsongs of the Mesozoic EP (Ace of Hearts, 1983)
 Magnetic Flip (Ace of Hearts, 1984)
 Beat of the Mesozoic (Ace of Hearts, 1985)
 Soundtracks V/A Compilation "To A Random" (Arf Arf, 1987)
 Dawn of the Cycads (Cuneiform, 2010)

Dredd Foole and the Din
With Dredd Foole, Roger Miller, Clint Conley, Pete Prescott, Martin Swope:
 Songs in Heat, "So Tough" b/w "Sanctuary" (Loose Music/Religious Records, 1982)

M2
With Roger Miller, Benjamin Miller:
 At Land's Edge (Feeding Tuber Records, 2012)

M3
M-3 (Roger Miller, Ben Miller, Larry Miller)
 M-3 (New Alliance Records, 1993)
 Unearthing (Sublingual, 2001)

Roger Miller 45s
 FWP 45 (Fun World Products, 2011)
 Big Steam (Good Road Records, 2012)

No Man
 Damage the Enemy (New Alliance, 1989)
 Whamon Express (SST, 1990)
 How the West Was Won (SST, 1991)

Out Trios Volume One
With William Hooker, Roger Miller, Lee Ranaldo:
 Monsoon (Atavistic, 2002)

Roger Miller's Exquisite Corpse
Unfold (SST, 1994)

Sproton Layer
With Roger Miller, Ben Miller, Larry Miller:
 With Magnetic Fields Disrupted (New Alliance Records, 1991, recorded 1970)
 With Magnetic Fields Disrupted (World in Sound Records, 2011, recorded 1970)

Trinary System
With Roger Miller, Larry Dersch, P. Andrew Willis:
Amplify the Amplifiers (5-song EP and 7") (Fun World, 2016)
Lights in the Center of Your Head (LP, 2019)

References

External links
 
 Mission of Burma
 Alloy Orchestra
 Trinary System
 Burmese Daze: A Conversation with Mission of Burma's Roger Miller
 Interview with the Ithaca Times, Nov.2006.

1952 births
Living people
American lyricists
American male singers
American rock singers
American rock pianists
Mission of Burma members
Musicians from Ann Arbor, Michigan
Musicians from Boston
Sproton Layer members
American male pianists
Atavistic Records artists
Matador Records artists
American post-punk musicians